Madeline Cowe is an Australian TV Host, model, and beauty pageant titleholder. She won Miss World Australia 2016 and placed 1st Runner-up at Miss Universe Australia 2015. She represented Australia at Miss World 2016 pageant.

Personal life
Cowe works as a model and TV host in Australia. She also was a contestant on Australia's Next Top Model.

Pageantry

Miss Universe Australia 2015
On 5 June 2015, Cowe placed 1st Runner-up at Miss Universe Australia 2015 in the ballroom at the Sofitel on Collins in Melbourne.

Miss World Australia 2016
Cowe was crowned Miss World Australia 2016 on 22 July 2016 in the ballroom at the Sofitel on Collins in Melbourne and competed at Miss World 2016 on 18 December 2016 in Washington, D.C., United States.

Miss World 2016
Cowe represented Australia at Miss World 2016 and placed Top 20 and earned the Miss World Oceania title.

Miss Universe Australia 2019
On 27 June 2019, Cowe placed 4th Runner-up at Miss Universe Australia 2019 in the Sofitel Melbourne on Collins, Melbourne, Victoria.

References

External links

Living people
Australian beauty pageant winners
Australian female models
Miss World 2016 delegates
Top Model contestants
Year of birth missing (living people)